This is a list of Fantasy Flight Games. It consists of board games, role paying games and card games.

Board games 

 A Game of Thrones (2003)
 A Dance with Dragons (2012)
 A La Carte (1989)
 Dessert (2010)
 Ad Astra (2009)
 Age of Conan (2009)
 Android (2008)
 Android: Infiltration (2012)
 Android: Mainframe (2016)
 Android: Netrunner (2012)
 Anima
 Shadow of Omega (2006)
 Beyond Good and Evil (2008)
 Twilight of the Gods (2011)
 Arcana (2009)
 Arkham Horror (2005)
 Curse of the Dark Pharoah (2006)
 Dunwich Horror (2006)
 The King in Yellow (2007)
 Kingsport Horror (2008)
 Black Goat of the Woods (2008)
 Innsmouth Horror (2009)
 Lurker at the Threshold (2010)
 Miskatonic Horror (2011)
 Curse of the Dark Pharoah (Revised) (2011)
 Aye, Dark Overlord! (2005)
 BattleLore (2006)
 Call to Arms (2007)
 Epic BattleLore (2007)
 Goblin Skirmishers (2007)
 Dwarven Battalion (2007)
 Goblin Marauders (2007)
 Hundred Years' War: Crossbows & Polearms (2007)
 Scottish Wars (2007)
 For Troll and Country (2008)
 Heroes (2009)
 Dragons (2010)
 Creatures (2010)
 Horrific Horde (2010)
 Bearded Brave (2010)
 Code of Chivalry (2011)
 Battles of Napoleon: The Eagle and the Lion (2010)
 Battles of Westeros (2010)
 Wardens of the West (2010)
 Wardens of the North (2010)
 Lords of the River (2011)
 Tribes of the Vale (2011)
 Brotherhood Without Banners (2012)
 House Baratheon Army Expansion (2012)
 Battlestar Galactica: The Board Game (2008)
 Pegasus (2009)
 Exodus (2010)
 Daybreak (2013)
 Beowulf: The Legend (2005)
 Beowulf: The Movie (2007)
 Black Gold (2011)
 Black Sheep (2008)
 Blood Bowl: Team Manager (2011)
 Blue Moon (2004)
 The Flit (2004)
 The Mimix (2004)
 The Khind (2004)
 The Terrah (2004)
 The Pillar (2005)
 The Aqua (2005)
 Allies (2005)
 Blessings (2005)
 Buka Invasion (2006)
 Blue Moon City (2006)
 Britannia (2006)
 Cadwallon: City of Thieves (2010)
 The King of Ashes (????)
 Cave Troll (2002)
 Chaos in the Old World (2009)
 The Horned Rat (2011)
 Chaos Marauders (2009)
 Citadels (2000)
 Sid Meier's Civilization: The Board Game (2010)
 Fame and Fortune (2011)
 Wisdom and Warfare (2013)
 Cold War: CIA vs. KGB (2012)
 Colossal Arena (1997)
 Condottiere (1995)
 Constantinopolis (2010)
 Cosmic Encounter (2008)
 Cosmic Incursion (2010)
 Cosmic Conflict (2011)
 Cosmic Alliance (2012)
 Deadwood (2011)
 Space Hulk: Death Angel (2010)
 Mission Pack 1 (2011)
 Space Marine Pack 1 (2011)
 Descent: Journeys in the Dark (2005)
 Descent: Journeys in the Dark Second Edition (2012)
 Conversion Kit (2012)
 Lair of the Wyrm (2012)
 Labyrinth of Ruin (2013)
 The Trollfens (2013)
 Shadow of Nerekhall (2014)
 Manor of Ravens (2014)
 Dragonheart (2010)
 Drakon (2006)
 Dungeonquest (2010)
 Dust (2007)
 Dust Tactics (2010)
 Expansions
 Operation Cyclone (2011)
 Operation "SeeLöwe" (2011)
 Operation Cerberus (2011)
 Operation Zverograd (2012)
 Operation Hades (????)
 Allies
 The Gunners (2011)
 Recon Boys (2011)
 BBQ Squad (2011)
 The Boss (2011)
 Medium Assault Walker (2011)
 Special Ops Rangers (2011)
 Light Assault Walker (2011)
 Grim Reapers (2011)
 Tank Busters (2011)
 Red Devils (2011)
 Heavy Assault Walker (2011)
 Corps Officers (2012)
 Allies Hero Pack (2012)
 MCW M3 (2012)
 Axis
 Battle Grenadiers (2011)
 Recon Grenadiers (2011)
 Laser Grenadiers (2011)
 Medium Panzer Walker (2011)
 Kommandotrupp (2011)
 Special Ops Grenadiers (2011)
 Light Panzer Walker (2011)
 Axis Gorillas (2011)
 Axis Zombies (2011)
 Heavy Recon Grenadiers (2011)
 Heavy Panzer Walker (2011)
 Heavy Kommandotrupp (2012)
 Axis Hero Pack (2012)
 Axis Panzer-Kampfläufer III (2012)
 SSU
 SSU KV47 Walker (2012)
 SSU Command Squad (2012)
 SSU Airborne Transport (2012)
 SSU Close Combat Squad (2012)
 SSU Battle Squad (2012)
 SSU Specialists (????)
 SSU Hero Pack (????)
 SSU Rifle Squad (2012)
 SSU Commissar Squad (2012)
 SSU Airborne Walker Transport (????)
 SSU Ground Attack Helicopter (????)
 IS-5 Heavy Tank (????)
 Red Guards Command Squad (????)
 Red Guards Anti-Tank Squad (????)
 Elder Sign (2011)
 Omens (videogame) (2011)
 Unseen Forces (2013)
 Gates of Arkham (2015)
 Omens of Ice (2016)
 Grave Consequences (2016)
 Eldritch Horror (board game) (2013)
 Forsaken Lore (2014)
 Mountains of Madness (2014)
 Strange Remnants (2015)
 Under the Pyramids (2015)
 Signs of Carcosa (2016)
 The Dreamlands (2017)
 Cities in Ruin (2017)
 Fortress America (2012)
 Fury of Dracula (2006)
 Gears of War (2011)
 Mission Pack 1 (2012)
 Hey, That's My Fish! (2003)
 Horus Heresy (2010)
 Ingenious (2004)
 Travel Edition (2006)
 Ingenious Challenges (2010)
 Isla Dorada (2010)
 Kingdoms (1994)
 Kingsburg (2007)
 To Forge a Realm (2009)
 Letter of Marque (2009)
 Letters from Whitechapel (2011)
 Lord of the Rings (2000)
 Friends & Foes (2001)
 Sauron (2002)
 Battlefields (2007)
 Lord of the Rings: The Confrontation (2006)
 Mad Zeppelin (2010)
 Mag Blast (2006)
 Magnifico: DaVinci's Art of War (2011)
 Mansions of Madness (2011)
 Big Expansions
 Forbidden Alchemy (2011)
 Call of the Wild (2013)
 Small Expansions
 Season of the Witch (2011)
 The Silver Tablet (2011)
 'Til Death Do Us Part (2011)
 House of Fears (2012)
 The Yellow Sign (2012)
 Mansions of Madness: Second Edition (2016)
 Merchant of Venus (2012)
 Micro Mutants: Evolution (2007)
 Invasion (2011)
 Middle-Earth Quest (2009)
 Moto Grand Prix (2008)
 New Angeles (2016)
 Nexus Ops (2005)
 Olympus (2010)
 Penguin (2007)
 Penny Arcade (2009)
 Rattlesnake (2007)
 Red November (2008)
 Revised Edition (2011)
 Relic (2013)
 Rex: Final Days of an Empire (2012)
 Rockband Manager (2012)
 Rune Age (2011)
 Oath and Anvil (????)
 Runebound (2005)
 Big Expansions
 The Island of Dread (2005)
 Sands of Al-Kalim (2007)
 The Frozen Wastes (2009)
 Mists of Zanaga (2010)
 Expansion Packs, Wave 1 (2005)
 Artifacts and Allies
 Crown of the Elder Kings
 Relics of Legend
 The Dark Forest
 The Scepter of Kyros
 The Terrors of the Tomb
 Expansion Packs, Wave 2 (2006)
 Avatars of Kelnov
 Champions of Kellos
 Cult of the Rune
 Drakes and Dragonspawn
 Shadows of Margath
 Walkers of the Wild
 Expansion Packs, Wave 3 (2008)
 Beasts and Bandits
 Rituals and Runes
 The Cataclysm
 The Seven Scions
 Traps and Terrors
 Weapons of Legend
 Character Decks (2006)
 Battlemage
 Blade Dancer
 Runemaster
 Shadow Walker
 Spiritbound
 Wildlander
 Runewars (2010)
 Banners of War (2011)
 Sky Traders (2012)
 Smileyface (2010)
 StarCraft (2007)
 Brood War (2008)
 Star Wars: Rebellion (2016)
 Rise of the Empire (2017)
 Talisman (2007)
 Big Expansions
 The Dungeon (2009)
 The Highland (2010)
 The Dragon (2011)
 The City (2013)
 Small Expansions
 The Reaper (2008)
 The Frostmarch (2009)
 The Sacred Pool (2010)
 The Blood Moon (2012)
 Tannhäuser (revised edition) (2010)
 The Adventurers: The Pyramid of Horus (2011)
 The Adventurers: The Temple of Chac (2009)
 The Hobbit (2010)
 Through the Desert (1998)
 Tide of Iron (2007)
 Expansions
 Days of the Fox (2008)
 Normandy (2008)
 Fury of the Bear (2011)
 Scenarios
 Designer Series (2008)
 Tribune: Primus Inter Pares (2008)
 Expansion (2008)
 Twilight Imperium (2005)
 Shattered Empire (2006)
 Shards of the Throne (2011)
 Prophecy of kings (2020)
 Ugg-Tect (2009)
 Ventura (2011)
 World of Warcraft: The Adventure Game (2008)
 World of Warcraft: The Board Game (2005)
 The Burning Crusade
 The Shadow of War
 Warrior Knights (2006)
 Crown and Glory (2007)
 Wiz-War (2012)

Card games

Collectible card games 

 Star Wars: Destiny
 Awakenings (2016)
 Spirit of Rebellion (2017)
Empire at War (2017)
Legacies (2018)
Way of the Force (2018)
Across the Galaxy (2018)
Convergence (2019)
Spark of Hope (2019)
Covert Missions (2020)

Living card games 

 A Game of Thrones: Second Edition
 Westeros Cycle Chapter Packs
 Taking the Black (2015)
 Road to Winterfell (2016)
 The King's Peace (2016)
 No Middle Ground (2016)
 Wolves of the North Deluxe (2016?)
 Android: Netrunner (2012)
 Genesis Cycle
 What Lies Ahead (2012)
 Trace Amount (2013)
 Cyber Exodus (2013)
 A Study in Static (2013)
 Humanity's Shadow (2013)
 Future Proof (2013)
 Creation and Control Deluxe (2013)
 Spin Cycle
 Opening Moves (2013)
 Second Thoughts (2013)
 Mala Tempora (2013)
 True Colors (2014)
 Fear and Loathing (2014)
 Double Time (2014)
 Honor and Profit Deluxe (2014)
 Lunar Cycle
 Upstalk (2014)
 The Spaces Between (2014)
 First Contact (2014)
 Up and Over (2014)
 All That Remains (2014)
 The Source (2014)
 Order and Chaos Deluxe (2015)
 SanSan Cycle
 The Valley (2015)
 Breaker Bay (2015)
 Chrome City (2015)
 The Underway (2015)
 Old Hollywood (2015)
 The Universe of Tomorrow (2015)
 Data and Destiny Deluxe (2015)
 Mumbad Cycle
 Kala Ghoda (2015/2016)
 Business First (2016)
 Democracy and Dogma (2016)
 Salsette Island (2016)
 The Liberated Mind (2016)
 Fear the Masses (2016)
 Arkham Horror: The Card Game (2016)
 Legend of the Five Rings (2017)
 Star Wars: The Card Game (2012)
 Hoth Cycle Expansions
 The Desolation of Hoth (2012)
 The Search for Skywalker (2013)
 A Dark Time (2013)
 Assault on Echo Base (2013)
 Battle of Hoth (2013)
 Escape from Hoth (2013)
 Edge of Darkness Deluxe (2013)
 Balance of the Force Deluxe (2013)
 Echoes of the Force Cycle
 Heroes and Legends (2014)
 Lure of the Dark Side (2014)
 Knowledge and Defense (2014)
 Join Us or Die (2014)
 It Binds All Things (2014)
 Darkness and Light (2014)
 Between the Shadows Deluxe (2014)
 Rogue Squadron Cycle
 Ready for Takeoff (2015)
 Draw Their Fire (2015)
 Evasive Maneuvers (2015)
 Attack Run (2015)
 Chain of Command (2015)
 Jump to Lightspeed (2015)
 Imperial Entanglements Deluxe (2015)
 Endor Cycle
 Solo's Command (2015)
 New Alliances (2016)
 The Forest Moon (2016)
 So Be It (2016)
 Press The Attack (2016)
 Untitled (2016)
Galactic Ambitions (2016)
 Warhammer 40,000: Conquest (2014)
 Warlord Cycle
 The Howl of Blackmane (2014)
 The Scourge (2015)
 Gift of the Etherals (2015)
 Zogwort's Curse (2015)
 The Threat Beyond (2015)
 Descendants of Isha (2015)
 The Great Devourer Deluxe (2015)
 Planetfall Cycle
 Decree of Ruin (2015)
 Boundless Hate (2016)
 Deadly Salvage (2016)
 What Lurks Below (2016)
 Wrath of the Crusaders (2016)
 The Final Gambit (2016)
 Legions of Death (2016)

Licensed card games 

 Cosmic Encounter: Duel
 The Lord of the Rings: The Card Game
 Marvel Champions: The Card Game
 X-Men: Mutant Insurrection

Unique deck games 
 KeyForge (2018)

Miniature games 

 Dust Warfare (2012)
 Zverograd (2012)
 Hades (2012)
 Icarus (2013)
 Star Wars: Armada (2015)
 Armada Core Set (2015)
 Dice Pack (2015)
 Victory-class Star Destroyer Expansion Pack (2015)
 CR90 Corellian Corvette Expansion Pack (2015)
 Nebulon-B Frigate Expansion Pack (2015)
 Assault Frigate Mark II Expansion Pack (2015)
 Gladiator-class Star Destroyer Expansion Pack (2015)
 Rebel Fighter Squadrons Expansion Pack (2015)
 Imperial Fighter Squadrons Expansion Pack (2015)
 Maneuver Tool Accessory Pack (2015)
 Home One Expansion Pack (2015)
 Imperial-class Star Destroyer Expansion Pack (2015)
 Imperial Raider Expansion Pack (2015)
 MC30c Frigate Expansion Pack (2015)
 Rogues and Villains Expansion Pack (2015)
 Imperial Assault Carriers Expansion Pack (2016)
 Rebel Transports Expansion Pack (2016)
 Interdictor Expansion Pack (2016)
 Liberty Expansion Pack (2016)
 Star Wars: Imperial Assault (2014)
 Dice Pack (2014)
 Imperial Villain Packs
 General Weiss (2015)
 Royal Guard Champion (2015)
 Kayn Somos (2015)
 Stormtroopers (2015)
 General Sorin (2016)
 Agent Blaise (2016)
 ISB Infiltrators (2016)
 Scum Villain Packs
 IG-88 (2015)
 Boba Fett (2015)
 Hired Guns (2015)
 Bantha Rider (2016)
 Dengar (2016)
 Bossk (2016)
 Rebel Ally Packs
 Han Solo (2015)
 Chewbacca (2015)
 Rebel Troopers (2015)
 Rebel Saboteurs (2015)
 R2-D2 and C-3PO (2015)
 Wookie Warriors (2015)
 Alliance Smuggler (2016)
 Leia Organa (2016)
 Echo Base Troopers (2016)
 Lando Calrissian (2016)
 Big Box Expansions
 Twin Shadows (2015)
 Return to Hoth (2015)
 The Bespin Gambit (2016)
 Jabba's Realm (2017)
 Heart of the Empire (2017)
 Tyrants of Lothal (2018)
 Star Wars Legion (2017)
 Core Game (2017)
 Dice, Rulers, and Movement Tools (2017)
 AT-RT Expansion (2017)
 Rebel Troopers Unit Expansion (2017)
 Stormtroopers Unit Expansion (2017)
 74-Z Speeder Bikes Expansion (2017)
 T-47 Airspeeders Expansion (2017)
 All-terrain Scout Transport Expansion (2017)
 Snowtrooper Unit Expansion (2017)
 General Veers Commander Expansion (2017)
 Fleet Troopers Unit Expansion (2018)
 Leia Organa Commander Expansion (2018)
 Priority Supplies Expansion (2018)
 Barriers Expansion (2018)
 Desert Ruins Battlemat (2018
 Desert Junkyard Battlemat (2018)
 Rebel Commandos Unit Expansion (2018)
 Han Solo Commander Expansion (2018)
 Scout Troopers Unit Expansion (2018)
 Boba Fett Operative Expansion (2018)
 1.4 FD Laser Cannon Team Unit Expansion (2018)
 E-Web Heavy Blaster Team Unit Expansion (2018)
 Premium Bases (2018)
 Imperial Royal Guards Unit Expansion (2018)
 Emperor Commander Expansion (2018)
 Wookiee Warriors Unit Expansion (2018)
 Chewbacca Operative Expansion (2018)
 Jyn Erso Commander Expansion (2018)
 Rebel Pathfinders Unit Expansion (2018)
 Orson Krennic Commander Expansion (2018)
 Deathtroopers Unit Expansion (2018)
 TX-225 GAVw Occupier Combat Assault Tank Unit Expansion (2019)
 X-34 Landspeeder Unit Expansion (2019)
 Sabine Wren Operative Expansion (2019)
 Bossk Operative Expansion (2019)
 Downed AT-ST Battlefield Expansion (2019)
 Rebel Veterans Unit expansion (2019)
 Tauntaun Riders Unit Expansion (2019)
 Star Wars: X-Wing (2012)
 X-Wing Core Set (2012)
 Dice Pack (2012)
 X-Wing Expansion Pack (2012)
 TIE Fighter Expansion Pack (2012)
 Y-Wing Expansion Pack (2012)
 TIE Advanced Expansion Pack (2012)
 Millennium Falcon Expansion Pack (2013)
 Slave I Expansion Pack (2013)
 A-Wing Expansion Pack (2013)
 TIE Interceptor Expansion Pack (2013)
 HWK-290 Expansion Pack (2013)
 Lambda-class Shuttle Expansion Pack (2013)
 B-Wing Expansion Pack (2013)
 TIE Bomber Expansion Pack (2013)
 Imperial Aces Expansion Pack (2014)
 Rebel Transport Expansion Pack (2014)
 Tantive IV Expansion Pack (2014)
 Z-95 Headhunter Expansion Pack (2014)
 TIE Defender Expansion Pack (2014)
 E-Wing Expansion Pack (2014)
 TIE Phantom Expansion Pack (2014)
 Rebel Aces Expansion Pack (2014)
 YT-2400 Freighter Expansion Pack (2014)
 VT-49 Decimator Expansion Pack (2014)
 Starfield and Death Star Assault Playmats (2015)
 Most Wanted Expansion Pack (2015)
 StarViper Expansion Pack (2015)
 M3-A Scyk Interceptor Expansion Pack (2015)
 IG-2000 Expansion Pack (2015)
 Imperial Raider Expansion Pack (2015)
 Hound's Tooth Expansion Pack (2015)
 Kihraxz Fighter Expansion Pack (2015)
 K-Wing Expansion Pack (2015)
 TIE Punisher Expansion Pack (2015)
 X-Wing The Force Awakens Core Set (2015)
 T-70 X-Wing Expansion Pack (2015)
 TIE/fo Fighter Expansion Pack (2015)
 Imperial Assault Carrier Expansion Pack (2015)
 Ghost Expansion Pack (2016)
 Inquisitor's TIE Expansion Pack (2016)
 Mist Hunter Expansion Pack (2016)
 Punishing One Expansion Pack (2016)
 Maneuver Dial Upgrade Kit (2016)
 Imperial Veterans Expansion Pack (2016)
 Colored Bases and Pegs (2016)
 Heroes of the Resistance Expansion Pack (2016)
 ARC-170 Expansion Pack (2016)
 Special Forces TIE Expansion Pack (2016)
 Protectorate Starfighter Expansion Pack (2016)
 Shadow Caster Expansion Pack (2016)

 Wings of War
 Base Games
 Famous Aces (2004)
 Watch Your Back! (2005)
 Burnings Drachens (2005)
 The Dawn of World War II (2007)
 Fire From the Sky (2009)
 Booster Packs
 Recon Patrol (2006)
 Top Fighters (2006)
 Immelmann (2008)
 Dogfight (2008)
 Flying Legends (2008)
 Eagles of the Reich (2008)
 Hit and Run (2010)
 Crossfire (2010)
 The Last Biplanes (2010)
 Revolution in the Sky (2010)
 Deluxe Expansions
 Balloon Busters (2010)
 Flight of the Giants (2010)
 World War I Revised Deluxe Set (2010)
 The Dawn of World War II: Deluxe Edition (2010)

Roleplaying games 

 Anima: Beyond Fantasy
 Core rulebook (2008)
 Game master's toolkit (2009)
 Gaïa 1: Beyond the Dreams (2010)
 Dominus Exxet: The Dominion of Ki (2011)
 Those Who Walked Amongst Us (2011)
 Arcana Exxet: Secrets of the Supernatural (2012)
 Black Crusade
 Core rulebook (2011)
 The Game Masters Kit (2011)
 Hand of Corruption (2012)
 The Tome of Fate (2012)
 Call of Cthulhu (Nocturnum trilogy)
 Long Shades (1997)
 Hollow Winds (1998)
 Deep Secrets (1999)
 Dark Heresy
 Core rulebook (2008)
 Game master's kit (2008)
 Purge the unclean (2008)
 The inquisitor's handbook (2008)
 Disciples of the dark gods (2008)
 Creatures anathema (2008)
 The Haarlock's legacy 1: Tattered fates (2009)
 The Haarlock's legacy 2: Damned cities (2009)
 The radical's handbook (2009)
 Ascension (2009)
 The Haarlock's legacy 3: Dead stars (2010)
 Blood of martyrs (2010)
 The Black Sepulchre (2011)
 Daemon Hunter (2011)
 The Church of the Damned (2011)
 Book of Judgement (2012)
 The Chaos Commandment (2012)
 The Lathe Worlds (2012)
 Dark Heresy Second Edition
 Core Rulebook (2014)
 Game Master's Kit (2014)
 Forgotten Gods (2014)
 Enemy Within (2014)
 Deathwatch
 Core Rulebook (2010)
 Game Master's Kit (2010)
 The Emperor Protects (2010)
 Rites of Battle (2011)
 Mark of the Xenos (2011)
 The Achilus Assault (2011)
 First Founding (2011)
 The Jericho Reach (2012)
 Rising Tempest (2012)
 Honour the Chapter (2012)
 The Outer Reach (????)
 Genesys
 Core Rulebook (2017) – Generic roleplaying system based on a variant of the Narrative Dice mechanics used in the Star Wars RPG.
 Expanded Player's Guide
 Game Master's Screen
 Realms of Terrinoth (2018) – Fantasy worldbook based on the world of Mennara featured in the Runewars Miniatures Game universe.
 KeyForge: Secrets of the Crucible – Crossover Science Fiction and Fantasy worldbook based on the world of The Crucible from the KeyForge card game universe.
 Android: Shadow of the Beanstalk – Cyberpunk worldbook based on the Android boardgame universe.
 Grimm
 Core Rulebook (2007)
 Only War
 Core Rulebook (2012)
 Game Master's Kit (2012)
 Final Testament (2013)
 Hammer of the Emperor (2013)
 Enemies of the Imperium (2013)
 No Surrender (2013)
 Rogue Trader
 Core Rulebook (2009)
 The Game Master's Kit (2009)
 Lure of the Expanse (2010)
 Into the Storm (2010)
 Edge of the Abyss (2010)
 The Frozen Reaches (2011)
 Battlefleet Koronus (2011)
 Citadel of Skulls (2011)
 Fallen Suns (2011)
 Hostile Acquisitions (2011)
 The Koronus Bestiary (2012)
 The Soul Reaver (2012)
 The Navis Primer (2012)
 Star Wars Roleplaying Game (three standalone games):
 Star Wars: Edge of the Empire
 Beta version (2012)
 Beginner Game (2012)
 Core Rulebook (2013)
 Star Wars: Age of Rebellion
 Beta version (2013)
 Beginner Game (2014)
 Core Rulebook (2014)
 Star Wars: Force and Destiny
 Beta version (2014)
 Warhammer Fantasy Roleplay
 Core Rulebook (2009)
 The Adventurer's Toolkit (2009)
 Game Master's Toolkit (2010)
 Player's Guide (2010)
 Game Master's Guide (2010)
 The Creature Guide (2010)
 Player's Vault (2010)
 Game Master's Vault (2010)
 The Creature Vault (2010)
 The Gathering Storm (2010)
 The Winds of Magic (2010)
 The Edge of Night (2010)
 Signs of Faith (2010)
 The Witch's Song (2011)
 Omens of War (2011)
 Black Fire Pass (2011)
 Lure of Power (2011)
 Faith of Sigmar (2012)
 Hero's Call (2012)
 Dreadfleet Captains (2012)
 Bright Order Magic (2012)
 Faith of Shallya (2012)
 The Enemy Within (????)
Other franchises
 Arkham Horror: Final Hour
 Discover: Lands Unknown
 Fallout
 Fallout Shelter: The Board Game
 The Lord of the Rings: Journeys in Middle-earth
 Twilight Imperium: Prophecy of Kings expansion

References